Fábio Santos da Silva (born 23 February 1981), or simply Fabão, was a Brazilian footballer.

Club career 
In 2010, Fabão played for the Syrian Premier League club Al-Karamah.

Honours 
Individual
 Lebanese Premier League Team of the Season: 2004–05, 2005–06, 2009–10

References

External links
 
 

1981 births
Living people
Brazilian footballers
Brazilian expatriate footballers
Association football defenders
Expatriate footballers in Syria
Expatriate footballers in Qatar
Expatriate footballers in Lebanon
Brazilian expatriate sportspeople in Lebanon
Al-Karamah players
Al Kharaitiyat SC players
Al Ahed FC players
Syrian Premier League players
Al Ansar FC players
Nejmeh SC players
Lebanese Premier League players
Brazilian expatriate sportspeople in Syria
Expatriate soccer players in South Africa
Brazilian expatriate sportspeople in South Africa
Brazilian expatriate sportspeople in Qatar
Brazilian expatriate sportspeople in Iraq
Expatriate footballers in Iraq
Zakho FC players
Iraqi Premier League players
Footballers from Rio de Janeiro (city)